Mattias Hellström (born 21 February 1978) is a former professional tennis player from Sweden.

Tennis career

Juniors
Hellström had a promising junior career, reaching the final at the Australian Open Boys' Singles in 1996, losing to fellow Swede Björn Rehnquist. He reached a singles high of No. 8 in the world on the ITF Junior rankings at the end of 1996.

Junior Grand Slam finals

Singles: 1 (1 runner-up)

Pro tour
Hellstrom made his ATP singles main draw debut at the 2004 Swedish Open as a qualifier, losing to world number 42, Irakli Labadze.

The Swede mainly participated on the Futures circuit, reaching three finals and winning two titles. Hellstrom also won three doubles titles on the Futures circuit, all in partnership with compatriot, Fredrik Lovén.

Hellstrom has a career high ATP singles ranking of 366 achieved on 15 October 2001 and a career high ATP doubles ranking of 422 achieved on 20 October 1997.

ATP Challenger and ITF Futures finals

Singles: 4 (2–2)

Doubles: 4 (3–1)

References

External links

1978 births
Living people
Swedish male tennis players
People from Eskilstuna
Sportspeople from Södermanland County